Erginus galkini is a species of sea snail, a true limpet, a marine gastropod mollusk in the family Erginidae, one of the families of true limpets.

Description

Distribution

References

 Chernyshev A.V. & Chernova T.V. 2002. Erginus galkini sp. nov. (Gastropoda, Lottiidae), a new species of limpets from the North Pacific Ocean. [In Russian]. Ruthenica 12(2): 107-112

External links

Erginidae
Gastropods described in 2002